Sport Lisboa e Benfica, commonly known as Benfica, is a Portuguese rugby union team based in Lisbon. Founded in 1924, Benfica is one of the most ancient Portuguese rugby teams. The men's team competes in the Campeonato Português de Rugby - Divisão de Honra, the first tier of rugby union in Portugal. In June 2014, the club refused the invitation to join the first division. The women's section competed in the Campeonato Nacional, the first tier, but recent changes in the competition mean they only compete in Sevens.

Unlike Benfica's other sports, which are in its direct control, thus getting vast investment, rugby is not directly under control of the club, but rather as an association that manages the sport with permission from the club, so investment is far more limited. Benfica currently hold home games at the Lisbon University Stadium, while their youth teams play at the Pupilos do Exército, near Colégio Militar in Lisbon.

Benfica hoped to secure a rugby field in Oeiras, in a 20-year rental, but the project never materialized. It was supposed to have a grass field capable of international matches, plus two synthetic fields for youth development, three football fields for Under-12, a 2,000 people stand and additional logistical support.

Benfica once had a Portuguese international in their team, Diogo Gama, who represented Portugal at the 2007 World Cup.

Honours
According to Benfica's official website

Men's
 Portuguese Championship
 Winners (9): 1959–60, 1960–61, 1961–62, 1969–70, 1975–76, 1985–86, 1987–88, 1990–91, 2000–01

 Portuguese Cup
 Winners (10): 1961, 1965, 1966, 1970, 1971, 1972, 1975, 1983, 1984, 1985

 Iberian Cup
 Winners (4): 1971, 1986, 1988, 2001

 Campeonato Regional de Lisboa
 Winners (12): 1931, 1936, 1937, 1939, 1942, 1947, 1948, 1949, 1950, 1951, 1954, 1955

 Taça de Honra da FPR
 Winners (3): 1949, 1950, 1966

Women's
 Campeonato Nacional
 Winners (5): 2006–07, 2007–08, 2008–09, 2010–11, 2012–13

 Taça de Portugal
 Winners (7): 2004–05, 2006–07, 2007–08, 2008–09, 2009–10, 2010–11, 2011–12

 Supertaça
 Winner (8): 2007, 2008, 2009, 2010, 2011, 2012, 2013, 2016

 Campeonato Nacional de Sevens
 Winners (5): 2009–10, 2012–13, 2013–14, 2014–15, 2015–16

 Taça de Portugal de Sevens
 Winners (3): 2014, 2014, 2016

References

External links
  

 
Portuguese rugby union teams
Rugby union
1924 establishments in Portugal